Oswego Theater, now known as Oswego 7 Cinemas, is a historic movie theater located at Oswego in Oswego County, New York.  It was designed in 1940 in the Art Deco style and opened in 1941.  The front features bands of yellow, red, and dark red brick that create broad horizontal and perpendicular belts.  A pair of cast stone, accordion pleated vertical stripes are included on the facade.  It was designed by architect John Eberson (1875–1964).

It was listed on the National Register of Historic Places in 1988.

References

External links
Cinema Treasures | Oswego 7 Cinemas

Theatres completed in 1941
Theatres on the National Register of Historic Places in New York (state)
Theatres in New York (state)
Art Deco architecture in New York (state)
Buildings and structures in Oswego County, New York
Tourist attractions in Oswego County, New York
John Eberson buildings
Oswego, New York
National Register of Historic Places in Oswego County, New York

Buildings and structures completed in 1941